Erythronychia is a genus of parasitic flies in the family Tachinidae. There are about nine described species in Erythronychia.

Species
These nine species belong to the genus Erythronychia:
 Erythronychia aliena Malloch, 1932
 Erythronychia aperta Malloch, 1932
 Erythronychia australiensis (Schiner, 1868)
 Erythronychia defecta Malloch, 1932
 Erythronychia grisea Malloch, 1932
 Erythronychia hirticeps Malloch, 1932
 Erythronychia minor Malloch, 1932
 Erythronychia princeps (Curran, 1927)
 Erythronychia velutina Malloch, 1932

References

Further reading

 
 
 
 

Tachinidae
Articles created by Qbugbot